Macledium spinosum is a variable species of flowering plant in the family Asteraceae, that is endemic to the southern Cape regions of South Africa.

Description 

A low, compact, spreading shrub, reaching a maximum of 50 cm in height. The leaves are small (15 x 5mm), spiny, with a grey, velvet leaf-surface.

The wide (20mm) protea-like flowerheads appear in Spring and Summer, and range in colour from white to purple.

Related species 
A closely related species, Macledium relhanioides, occurs in similar areas in the western Little Karoo and Overberg, but tends to be confined to quartzitic outcrops and quartz-fields. 

Macledium relhanioides differs by having longer leaves (20mm) and smaller flowerheads (10mm) that have prominent pink, spiny bracts (but only rudimentary ray-florets).

Distribution and habitat 
This species can be found from Worcester in the west, eastwards through the Little Karoo and Overberg regions, as far east as Somerset East. 

It is most common in clay-rich, shale-derived soils, in Renosterveld and Succulent Karoo vegetation types.

References

Further reading 
 KwaZulu-Natal Wild Flowers by Elsa Pooley, p. 446.
 Lawalrée, A. & Mvukiyumwami, J. 1982. Le genre Dicoma Cassini (Asteraceae) en Afrique centrale. Bulletin du Jardin Botanique National de Belgique 52: 151-163.

Dicoma
Flora of South Africa
Renosterveld